is the third remix album by P-Model.

Overview
The album consists of a selection of rearrangements of older songs played by the "defrosted" lineup of the band in their style. Besides these songs, the "defrosted" P-Model also performed nine other songs from older albums (including In a Model Room, Landsale and Scuba, which are not represented in this selection) that did not receive studio remixes.

It is part of a pair of conceptual takes on a live album, alongside Pause: For this album, Hirasawa aimed to replicate the songs as they sounded to the band members. Since the band heard their music on stage coming from multiple speakers/monitors, they got a "flood" of distorted sound. As such, the album was mastered to bring out harshness and loudness, aiming to replicate that situation as well as the tension and the intensity of the formation's live shows.

Track listing

Personnel
Susumu Hirasawa  - Vocals, Synthesizer, Guitar, Computer programming, Amiga
Hikaru Kotobuki - Synthesizer, Computer programming, Amiga, Vocoder, Backing Vocals
Kayo "Kokubo" Matsumoto - "MAMA" Vocal on "OH! MAMA" (sampled)
Boris Karloff and O.P. Heggie - acting in "LEAK" (sampled)
Masanori Chinzei - Engineering

Release history

References

External links
 The Way of LIVE at NO ROOM - The official site of Susumu Hirasawa (P-MODEL)

P-Model albums
1994 remix albums
DIW Records live albums
Japanese-language albums